The Japan Times is Japan's largest and oldest English-language daily newspaper.

History

The Japan Times was launched by Motosada Zumoto on 22 March 1897, with the goal of giving Japanese people an opportunity to read and discuss news and current events in English to help Japan to participate in the international community. The newspaper was independent of government control, but from 1931 onward, the paper's editors experienced mounting pressure from the Japanese government to submit to its policies. In 1933, the Japanese Ministry of Foreign Affairs appointed Hitoshi Ashida, former ministry official, as chief editor.

During World War II, the newspaper served as an outlet for Imperial Japanese government communication and editorial opinion. It was successively renamed The Japan Times and Mail (1918–1940) following its merger with The Japan Mail, The Japan Times and Advertiser (1940–1943) following its merger with The Japan Advertiser, and Nippon Times (1943–1956), before reverting to the Japan Times title in 1956. The temporary change to Nippon Times occurred during the ban on English language sentiment during World War II-era Japan.

Shintaro Fukushima (1907–1987) became president of The Japan Times in 1956. He sold some of the company's shares to Toshiaki Ogasawara  (小笠原 敏晶 Ogasawara Toshiaki), who was chairman of Nifco, a manufacturer of automotive fasteners. Fukushima renounced management rights in 1983, after which Nifco acquired control of The Japan Times and brought about staff changes and alterations to the company's traditions established in 1897. Ogasawara served as the chairman and publisher of The Japan Times until 2016, when his daughter Yukiko Ogasawara (小笠原 有輝子 Ogasawara Yukiko) succeeded him as chairman of the company. She had previously served as the company's president from 2006 to 2012, when she was replaced by career Japan Times staffer Takeharu Tsutsumi. Nifco sold The Japan Times to PR firm News2u Holdings, Inc. on 30 June 2017.

Content

The Japan Times publishes The Japan Times, The Japan Times On Sunday, The Japan Times Alpha (a bilingual weekly), books in English and Japanese. Staff at The Japan Times are represented by two unions, one of which is Tozen.

Print
The Japan Times, Ltd. publishes three periodicals: The Japan Times, an English-language daily broadsheet; The Japan Times Weekly, an English-language weekly in tabloid form; and Shukan ST, also a weekly in tabloid form, targeted at Japanese readers learning the English language. Since 16 October 2013, The Japan Times has been printed and sold along with The New York Times International Edition.

Web
Printed stories from The Japan Times are archived online. The newspaper has a readers' forum and, since 2013, the website offers a section for readers' comments below articles. This came about during a redesign and redevelopment of the newspaper, using Responsive Web Design techniques so the site is optimised for all digital devices. The Japan Times has a social media presence on Twitter, and Facebook since 2007.

Controversy
After being acquired by News2u, The Japan Times changed its editorial stance and contributor lineup as part of efforts to reduce criticism of the newspaper as an "anti-Japanese" outlet. In November 2018, it was announced in an editor's note that subsequent articles would use the term "wartime laborers" rather than "forced labor", and "comfort women" would be referred to as "women who worked in wartime brothels, including those who did so against their will, to provide sex to Japanese soldiers", instead of the previously used "women who were forced to provide sex for Japanese troops before and during World War II." The change drew immediate criticism from readers and employees, with particular concerns expressed over the paper's apparent alignment with the political positions of Prime Minister Shinzō Abe. In response to these criticisms, The Japan Times wrote in an article on 7 December 2018, "We must admit that the editorial note undermined the relationships of trust we have built with our readers, reporters and staff. I would like to apologize for the inconvenience," and denied criticism that it was in line with the intentions of the administration.

Contributors
 Mark Brazil, Wild Watch nature columnist (1982–2015)
 Monty DiPietro, art critic
 John Gauntner, Nihonshu columnist
 John Gunning, sumo columnist
 Don Maloney
 Fume Miyatake, Women in Business columnist
 Jean Pearce, community columnist
 Ezra Pound, Italian correspondent
 Dreux Richard, African community, investigative
 Donald Richie, book, film critic
 Elyse Rogers, Women in Business columnist
 Mark Schilling, film critic
 Edward Seidensticker
 Fred Varcoe, sports editor
 Robert Yellin Ceramic Scene columnist

See also

 Asahi Shimbun
 International Herald Tribune
 Yomiuri Shimbun

References

Further reading

External links

 The Japan Times Online

1897 establishments in Japan
Publications established in 1897
Daily newspapers published in Japan
English-language newspapers published in Japan
Newspapers published in Tokyo